The Duc de Bourgogne was an 80-gun ship of the line of the French Navy.

Career 
She was refitted twice, in 1761 and 1779, when she received a copper sheathing.

On 2 May 1780, she departed Brest as the flagship of the 7-ship and 3-frigate Expédition Particulière under Admiral Ternay, escorting 36 transports carrying troops to support the Continental Army in the War of American Independence. The squadron comprised the 80-gun Duc de Bourgogne, under Ternay d'Arsac (admiral) and Médine (flag captain); the 74-gun Neptune, under Sochet Des Touches, and Conquérant, under La Grandière; and the 64-gun Provence under Lombard, Ardent under Bernard de Marigny, Jason under La Clocheterie and Éveillé under Le Gardeur de Tilly, and the frigates Surveillante under Villeneuve Cillart, Amazone under La Pérouse, and Bellone. Amazone, which constituted the vanguard of the fleet, arrived at Boston on 11 June 1780.

She took part in the Battle of Cape Henry on 16 March 1781 under Nicolas-Louis de Durfort.

Duc de Bourgogne took part in the Battle of the Saintes, where she collided with Bourgogne.

In 1792, she was renamed Peuple, and Caton in 1794.

She was condemned in February 1798 at Brest, and eventually broken up in January 1800.

Notes, citations, and references 
Notes

Citations

Bibliography
 
 
 
 
 

Ships of the line of the French Navy
1751 ships